Night Monster is a 1942 American black-and-white horror film featuring Bela Lugosi and produced and distributed by Universal Pictures Company.  The movie uses an original story and screenplay by Clarence Upson Young and was produced and directed by Ford Beebe.  For box office value, star billing was given to Bela Lugosi and Lionel Atwill, but the lead roles were played by Ralph Morgan, Irene Hervey and Don Porter, with Atwill in a character role as a pompous doctor who becomes a victim to the title character, and Lugosi in a small part as a butler.

The film is in many respects a remake of Doctor X, with virtually the same denouement. Both films also feature Atwill as a doctor.

Plot

In a small town bordering a swampy region, unexplained murders and rumors of mysterious happenings surround the swamp-based home of the reclusive but respected Curt Ingston (Morgan). Ingston uses a wheelchair and has invited to his home the three doctors who were trying to cure him when his paralysis set in. Already in the household are his grim-humored butler Rolf; a lecherous chauffeur, Laurie; a mannish housekeeper, Miss Judd; an Eastern mystic, Agar Singh; and Ingston's allegedly mentally ill sister, Margaret.  Outside, the gate is watched by a shrivelled old hunchback called Torque.

Coincident with the arrival of the three male physicians is the appearance of a lady psychiatrist, Dr. Lynn Harper, summoned secretly by Margaret to prove she is not insane and help her secure freedom from the control of Ingston and Miss Judd.  She arrives accompanied by a neighbor: mystery-writer Dick Baldwin, who rescued her after her car broke down in the swamp.  Neither Ingston nor Miss Judd welcome her presence, but must contend with keeping her overnight until her car can be repaired.

Following dinner, at which Ingston's conviction that the three doctors are directly responsible for his current condition becomes evident, the party witnesses an exhibition of materialization of an Egyptian skeleton by Agar Singh. Dr. Harper is forbidden to meet with Margaret. Then, one by one, the doctors are frightfully killed as they prepare for bed. Suspecting Ingston, Dick and Police Captain Beggs confront him in his room, but discover he is not paralyzed but a quadruple amputee. Suspicion then falls on Laurie, who was last seen driving a murdered ex-employee of the household back to town, but he, too, winds up dead.

Ultimately, Dick confronts the killer outside the estate as he menaces Lynn, and discovers it is Ingston after all: by studying under Agar Singh, he has learned how to materialize arms and legs, hands and feet for himself, long enough to accomplish his evil deeds. As Dick struggles with him to the death, Margaret sets fire to the unholy house, committing suicide while taking the malevolent Miss Judd with her. As the house burns to the ground, Dick and Lynn are saved by Agar Singh, when Singh shoots Ingston. Rolf and Torque have simply disappeared somewhere along the line, without explanation.

Cast

Release

Home media
The film was released on VHS by Universal Studios Home Entertainment on August 8, 1995. The studio would release the film for the first time on DVD September 13, 2009 as a part of its two-disk "Universal Horror: Classic Movie Archive". It was later released by Willette Acquisition Corporation on March 17, 2015.

Reception

The New York Times gave the film a negative review, calling it "tedious and fantastic".
Author and film critic Leonard Maltin awarded the film two and a half out of four stars, calling it an "intriguing grade-B thriller".
On his website Fantastic Movie Musings and Ramblings, Dave Sindelar called it one of his favorites among Universal's minor horror films, commending the film's use of sound as being quite effective. Craig Butler from Allmovie wrote, "there's a lot that's wrong with Night Monster -- but there's also a fair amount of pleasure to be had from this admittedly-second tier Universal horror flick, especially for those who can't get enough of this kind of picture." Graeme Clark from The Spinning Image gave the film 6/10 stars, calling it "[a] minor but not unenjoyable chiller". TV Guide awarded the film 2/5 stars, stating that the film was only "Somewhat creepy".

References

External links

 
 
 
 
 

1942 films
1942 horror films
American black-and-white films
American horror films
American mystery films
Universal Pictures films
Films directed by Ford Beebe
Films scored by Hans J. Salter
1940s English-language films
1940s American films